In the Army Now may refer to:

 "In the Army Now" (song), a 1981 song by Rob and Ferdi Bolland, covered by Status Quo and Sabaton
 In the Army Now (album), a 1986 album by Status Quo
 In the Army Now (film), 1994 war comedy film

See also
You're in the Army Now (disambiguation)